Julius Sabatauskas (born 1 April 1958 in Syktyvkar) is an engineer, a lawyer, Deputy Speaker of the Seimas and Member of the Seimas since 2000.

Biography
Born in Syktyvkar, Komi Republic, Russian SFSR, in a family of deportees. In 1976 graduated from high school in Jonava. 1981 graduated from Kaunas University of Technology, Faculty of Automation, engineer of automated control systems. 2002 graduated from Mykolas Romeris University with a master's degree in Law and Management.

Political life
Member of the Social Democratic Party of Lithuania since 1989, member of the council since 1997.

From 1990 to 1995 was a deputy of Alytus City Council, deputy chairman of the council. Since 1995 until 2003 Alytus City Councillor. 2000 was the controller of Alytus City Municipality.

Since 2000 Member of the Seimas.

References

Sources
 https://www.lrs.lt/sip/portal.show?p_r=38249&p_k=1&p_a=498&p_asm_id=23521

1958 births
Living people
Social Democratic Party of Lithuania politicians
Members of the Seimas
21st-century Lithuanian politicians
Kaunas University of Technology alumni
Mykolas Romeris University alumni